Kenny Wiggins (born August 8, 1988) is an American football guard who is a free agent. He was signed by the Baltimore Ravens as an undrafted free agent in 2011. He played college football at Fresno State. Wiggins has also played with the San Francisco 49ers and the San Diego / Los Angeles Chargers.

Professional career

Baltimore Ravens
After going undrafted in the 2011 NFL Draft, Wiggins was signed to the Baltimore Ravens practice squad on Monday November 28, 2011.

San Francisco 49ers
Wiggins signed with the San Francisco 49ers on January 31, 2012. He was cut prior to the regular season on September 1, 2012.

Wiggins again signed with 49ers on February 7, 2013. He was released by the team on August 31, 2013.

San Diego / Los Angeles Chargers
On November 16, 2013, Wiggins was promoted to the Chargers' active roster. He was cut two days later to make room for Willie Smith. He was re-signed to the practice squad and once again promoted to the active roster on November 23, 2013. He was released on August 20, 2014. Later on in September Wiggins was resigned. On October 4, 2015, Wiggins got his first career start against the Cleveland Browns in for the injured Orlando Franklin.

On March 20, 2017, Wiggins re-signed with the Chargers. He started all 16 games at right guard for the Chargers in 2017.

Detroit Lions
On March 15, 2018, Wiggins signed with the Detroit Lions. He was named a backup guard to start the season, but was thrust into a starting role at right guard following an injury to T. J. Lang. He was officially named the starter in Week 10 for the rest of the season, starting in a total of 10 games.

In 2019, Wiggins played in 14 games, starting three at both guard spots, before being placed on injured reserve on December 16, 2019.

On April 16, 2020, Wiggins re-signed with the Lions. He was released on September 5, 2020 and signed to the practice squad the next day. He was elevated to the active roster on September 12 for the team's week 1 game against the Chicago Bears and reverted to the practice squad on September 14. He was promoted to the active roster on September 19, 2020. He was released on October 24.

New York Giants
On November 3, 2020, Wiggins was signed by the New York Giants. He was waived on November 13, 2020, and re-signed to the practice squad four days later. He signed a reserve/future contract on January 4, 2021.

On August 31, 2021, Wiggins was released by the Giants and re-signed to the practice squad the next day. He was released on September 7.

References

External links

Fresno State Bulldogs bio
San Francisco 49ers bio
Los Angeles Chargers bio

1988 births
Living people
American football offensive tackles
Baltimore Ravens players
Detroit Lions players
Fresno State Bulldogs football players
Los Angeles Chargers players
New York Giants players
Players of American football from California
San Diego Chargers players
San Francisco 49ers players
Sportspeople from Elk Grove, California